Raivis Broks (born February 20, 1984, Madona) is a Latvian bobsledder who has competed since 2007. His best finish at the FIBT World Championships was 15th in the four-man event at Altenberg, Germany in 2008.

Broks also finished 11th in the four-man event at the 2010 Winter Olympics in Vancouver.

References

1984 births
Bobsledders at the 2010 Winter Olympics
Bobsledders at the 2014 Winter Olympics
Latvian male bobsledders
Living people
Olympic bobsledders of Latvia
People from Madona
University of Latvia alumni